WOWC (105.3 FM, "WOW Country") is a radio station licensed to serve Morrison, Tennessee.  The station is owned by Peg Broadcasting, LLC. It airs a country music format.

The station was assigned the WOWC call letters by the Federal Communications Commission on June 30, 2008.

Ownership
In March 2008, Peg Broadcasting Crossville LLC (Jeffrey Shaw, president) reached an agreement to purchase WRKK-FM from Clear Channel (John Hogan, CEO/radio) as part of a six station package. The terms of the deal were undisclosed.

Station history
From 2000 to 2008, the station was granted the call letters WRKK-FM, selected to better match the rock music format. Until the June 2008 format flip to country music and call letter change to WOWC, WRKK-FM was branded on air as "The Rock Dog".

References

External links
Peg Broadcasting official website

Country radio stations in the United States
OWC
Warren County, Tennessee